Meg Lemon (born 5 October 1989)  is an Australian Paralympic cyclist. She represented Australia at the 2020 Tokyo Paralympics where she won a bronze medal.

Personal
Lemon was born on 5 October 1989. She attended Sacred Heart College in Adelaide, South Australia. Lemon has a bachelor's degree, Nutrition and Dietetics from Flinders University and works as a sports dietitian. Lemon sustained a brain injury when hit by a car while riding to work and left her with a weakened right side of her body.

Cycling
Lemon is classified as a C4 cyclist. In her international debut at the 2017 UCI Para-cycling Track World Championships in Los Angeles, United States, she finished fourth in the Women's C4-C5 Scratch Race.

In September 2017, at the 2017 UCI Para-cycling Road World Championships, Pietermaritzburg, South Africa, Lemon won bronze medals in the Women's Time Trial C4 and Women's Road Race C4. At the 2018 UCI Para-cycling Track World Championships in Rio de Janeiro, Brazil, she won a bronze medal in the Women's Pursuit C4 and was ninth in Women's Scratch Race C4-5 and Women's 500 m Time Trial C4. At the 2018 UCI Para-cycling Road World Championships, Maniago, Italy she won the bronze medal in the Women's Time Trial C4 and finished fourth in the Women's Road Race C4.

In 2018, Lemon was a South Australian Institute of Sport scholarship athlete.

At the 2019 UCI Para-cycling Track World Championships in Apeldoorn, Netherlands, she won the silver medal in the Women's Scratch Race C4 and the bronze medal in the Women's Individual Pursuit C4.

At the 2019 UCI Para-cycling Road World Championships in Emmen, Netherlands, she won bronze medals in the Women's Time Trial C4 and Road Race C4.

At the 2020 UCI Para-cycling Track World Championships, Milton, Ontario, she won the silver medal in the Women's Individual Pursuit C4.

At the 2020 Tokyo Paralympics, Lemon won the bronze medal in the Women's Road Time Trial C4 with a time of 41:14.42 and finished fourth in Women's Individual Pursuit C4, ninth together with Amanda Reid and Gordon Allan in the Mixed Team Sprint C1–5 and eighth in Women's Road Race C4-5.

Lemon won the silver medal in the Women's Road Race C4 at 2022 UCI Para-cycling Road World Championships in Baie-Comeau.

At the 2022 UCI Para-cycling Track World Championships in  Saint-Quentin-en-Yvelines, France, she won two bronze medals - Women's Pursuit C4 and Women's Scratch Race C4.

References

External links 

Australian Cycling Profile

1989 births
Living people
Paralympic cyclists of Australia
Cyclists at the 2020 Summer Paralympics
Australian female cyclists
South Australian Sports Institute alumni
Sportswomen from South Australia
People educated at Sacred Heart College, Adelaide
Medalists at the 2020 Summer Paralympics
Paralympic bronze medalists for Australia
20th-century Australian women
21st-century Australian women